Ashcombe is a village and civil parish in the Teignbridge district of Devon, England.

Ashcombe may also refer to:
 Baron Ashcombe, a title in the Peerage of the United Kingdom
 The Ashcombe School, Dorking, Surrey, England
 Ashcombe Volleyball Club, Dorking, Surrey, England
 George Shorrock Ashcombe Wheatcroft (1905-1987), English chess master
 Herbert Ashcombe Walker (1868-1949), British railway manager

See also
 Ashcombe House (disambiguation); includes Ashcombe Park
 Ashcombe Mill, Kingston, a post mill near the village of Kingston near Lewes, East Sussex, England
 Ayshcombe baronets, a former title in the Baronetage of England